The Scots College (or The Pontifical Scots College) (Italian: Il Pontificio Collegio Scozzese) in Rome is the main seminary for the training of men for the priesthood from the dioceses of the Roman Catholic Church in Scotland.

History

The Scots College was established by Clement VIII on 5 December 1600, when it was assigned the revenue of the old Scots' hospice. At first the college was sited in a little house in what is known today as Via del Tritone, opposite the church of Santa Maria di Costantinopoli. In 1604 it was transferred to Via Felice, now called Via delle Quattro Fontane, where a bust of the last of the Stuarts, Henry Cardinal Duke of York can be seen. The college remained there until 1962.

From 1615 to 1773, the Rectors of the Scots College were drawn from the ranks of the Society of Jesus. After the Jesuits were suppressed in 1773 by Clement XIV, by his brief Dominus ac Redemptor, the College was administered by a series of Italian clerics until 1800 and the arrival of Paul MacPherson, a Scot, who served as Rector for 38 years. Since then the Rectors have all been drawn from the ranks of Scotland's secular clergy.

The other long-serving Rector of the College, who also served for 38 years was Rt Rev. Msgr William Canon Clapperton (1886-1969) who served as Rector from 1922-1960. After his retirement he remained in Rome as canon of St John Lateran and is buried in the college plot at the Campo Verano cemetery in Rome.

The College moved to its current location on the Via Cassia some 4 miles from the city centre in 1962. The new College was designed by Renato Costa and was officially opened by Pope Paul VI on 18 November 1964. Seminarians at the Pontifical Scots College in Rome spend their first two years studying Philosophy at the Angelicum. After completion of Philosophy, and depending on their fluency in Italian, they take up the study of theology either at the Pontifical Gregorian University or the Angelicum, where theology is also offered in English. Priests taking part in postgraduate theology courses continue to stay at the College. The celebration of the Feast of St. Andrew is a high point of the Scots College year.

The chapel of the college houses the original tombstone of James Francis Edward Stuart ("King James III and VIII").

On 14 April 2016, the community of the Scots College were granted a private audience with Pope Francis at the Apostolic Palace to mark the 400th anniversary of its becoming a seminary. In 2017, seminarians from the college were invited to serve at the Easter Vigil at St. Peter's Basilica.  After a 2020 review projected unaffordable upgrade costs for the Via Cassia seminary, the Scottish Bishops announced a plan to relocate to a more central location in Rome beginning in 2021.

Rectors 
 
 Bernardino Paolini (1600-1615)
 Patrick Anderson SJ (1615)
 Carlo Venozzi SJ (1615-1619)
 Giovanni Marietti SJ (1619-1622)
 George Elphinstone SJ (1622-1644)
 William Christie SJ (1644-1646)
 Francis Dempster SJ (1646-1649)
 Andrew Leslie SJ (1649-1652)
 Adam Gordon SJ (1652-1655)
 Gilbert Talbot SJ (1655-1658)
 Francis Dempster SJ (1658-1663)
 Gilbert Talbot SJ (1663-1670)
 John Strachan SJ (1670-1671)
 Hector de Marini SJ (1671-1674)
 William Lesie SJ (1674-1683)
 Andrew MacGhie SJ (1683-1690)
 William Lesie SJ (1692-1695)
 James Forbes SJ (1695-1701)
 Diego Calcagni SJ (1701-1704)
 Giovanni Naselli SJ (1704-1708)
 Thomas Fyfe SJ (1708-1712)
 William Clark SJ (1712-1721)
 Alexander Ferguson SJ (1721-1724)
 Luca Gritta SJ (1724-1729)
 Francisco Marini SJ (1729-1731)
 Giovanni Morici SJ (1731-1738)
 Livio Urbani SJ (1738-1747)
 Lorenzo Alticozzi SJ (1747-1766)
 Giovanni Corsedoni SJ (1766-1773)
 Vincenzo Massa (1773-1773)
 Lorenzo Antonini (1773-1774)
 Alessandro Marzi (1774-1777)
 Ignazio Ceci (1777-1781)
 Francisco Marchioni (1781-1798)
 Rev. Paul MacPherson (1800-1826)
 Rev. Angus MacDonald (1826-1833)
 Rev. Paul MacPherson (1833-1846)
 Rev. Alexander Grant (1846-1878)
 Rev. James Campbell (1878-1897)
 Rt. Rev. Mgr. Robert Fraser (1897-1913)
 Rt. Rev. Mgr. Donald Mackintosh (1913-1922)
 Rt. Rev. Mgr. William Canon Clapperton (1922-1960)
 Rt. Rev. Mgr. Philip Flanagan (1960-1967)
 Rev. Daniel P. Boyle (1967-1973)
 Rt. Rev. Mgr. Sean O'Kelly (1973-1981)
 Rt. Rev. Mgr. James Clancy (1981-1986)
 Rev. John Fitzsimmons (1986-1989)
 Rt. Rev. Mgr. John McIntyre (1989-1995)
 Rt. Rev. Mgr. Christopher J. McElroy (1995-2004)
 Rt. Rev. Mgr. Philip Tartaglia (2004-2005)
 Rev. Paul Milarvie (2005-2009)
 Rt. Rev. Mgr. John Hughes (2009-2015)
 Very Rev. Daniel Fitzpatrick (2015-2022)
 Very Rev. Mark Canon Cassidy (2022-present)

Notable alumni
Alexander Dunbar Winchester (1625–1708), Apostolic Prefect for Scotland
George Hay (1729–1811), served as Vicar Apostolic of the Lowland District in Scotland from 1778 until 1805
John Paul Jameson (d. 1700), entered the college in 1677, ordained priest in 1685
Wilhelm von Leslie (1657–1727), Prince Bishop of Laibach, entered the College in 1675, ordained priest in 1681
Charles Erskine (1739-1811), Cardinal and Vatican diplomat
Aeneas Chisholm (1836-1918), Bishop of Aberdeen from 1899 until 1918
Frederick Rolfe (1860–1913), better known as Baron Corvo, writer
Canon John Gray (1866-1934), priest and poet, founding parish priest of St Peter's Morningside Edinburgh
Adrian Fortescue (1874–1923)
Thomas Winning (1925–2001), Cardinal, Archbishop of Glasgow from 1974 until 2001
Maurice Taylor (born 5 May 1926), Bishop of the Diocese of Galloway from 1981 until 2004
Father George Thompson (1928-2016), priest, teacher and MP, studied at the Scots College in the early 1950s
Mario Conti (1934-2022), Archbishop of Glasgow from 2002 until 2012
Joseph Devine (1937-2019), Bishop of Motherwell from 1983 until 2013
John Cunningham (1938-2021), Bishop of Galloway from 2004 until 2014
Philip Tartaglia (1951-2021), Archbishop of Glasgow from 2012 until 2021
Stephen Robson (born 1 April 1951), Bishop of Dunkeld since 2013
William Nolan (born 26 January 1954), Archbishop of Glasgow since 2022
Paul Laverty (born 1957), screenwriter and lawyer, studied for priesthood but did not continue to ordination, obtained a degree in philosophy from the Pontifical Gregorian University in Rome
Leo Cushley (born 18 June 1961), Archbishop of St Andrews and Edinburgh since 2013
John Keenan (born 19 December 1964), Bishop of the Diocese of Paisley

Other seminaries
Scotus College, then founded in 1985 as Chesters College, located at Bearsden (Greater Glasgow), closed in 2009
Royal Scots College, located at Salamanca (Spain) since 1988 (formerly at Madrid and Valladolid)
St Andrew's College, founded in 1953 at Drygrange (Melrose) in the Scottish Borders, closed in 1986
Scots College, University of Paris, located at Paris from 1333 until 1793

See also
Sant'Andrea degli Scozzesi
 List of Jesuit sites

References

Further reading
 Abbe Paul Macpherson, History of the Scots College, Rome, 1600-1792, John S. Burns, 1961

External links

Seminaries associated with the Roman Catholic Bishops' Conference of Scotland
Address of Pope Francis to the Staff and Students of the Pontifical Scots College, 14 April 2016

Scots School
Scots School
Scots School
1600 establishments in Italy
Catholic seminaries
Seminaries and theological colleges in Italy
Universities and colleges in Rome